The Ministry of Presidency of the Republic of Somaliland (MoP)  was a Somaliland government ministry which is concerned about the presidential affairs. The last minister was Mohamoud Hashi Abdi

Ministers of Presidency

See also

 Politics of Somaliland
 Ministry of Civil Aviation (Somaliland)
 Ministry of Parliamentary Relations

References

External links
Official Site of the Government of Somaliland

Government ministries of Somaliland